The University of Montemorelos (Spanish: Universidad de Montemorelos) is a private coeducational Seventh-day Adventist university located in Montemorelos, Nuevo León, Mexico. The University grants degrees in medicine, nursing, nutrition, management, arts and various other disciplines.

Montemorelos is one of only five Adventist universities worldwide that grant degrees in medicine, the others being Loma Linda University, Universidad Adventista del Plata, Babcock University and Universidad Peruana Unión.

It is a part of the Seventh-day Adventist education system, the world's second largest Christian school system.

University of Montemorelos Logo University of Montemorelos (UM) is located in Montemorelos, Nuevo León, Mexico. It is locally known as Universidad de Montemorelos A.C.. The university was established in 1942. It is accredited by Secretaría de Educación de Nuevo León.

See also

 List of Seventh-day Adventist colleges and universities
 Seventh-day Adventist education

References

Universities and colleges affiliated with the Seventh-day Adventist Church
Universities and colleges in Nuevo León
1941 establishments in Mexico